Martina Pawlik (born 8 December 1969) is a former professional tennis player from Germany.

Biography
Pawlik, who began competing on tour in 1986, won two ITF singles titles in the 1988 season, including a $25,000 event held in Chicago.

Her best performance on the WTA Tour was a quarterfinal appearance at the 1989 Fernleaf Classic in Wellington.

In 1989, she reached a career high 106 in the world and appeared that year in the main draw of all four Grand Slam tournaments. She made the third round of the 1989 French Open, where she beat world No. 35, Terry Phelps, and Japan's Kimiko Date, before losing in three sets to ninth seed Katerina Maleeva.

She appeared for the last time on the WTA Tour in 1990 but continued to play in the occasional ITF event. In 1991 she won a $25k tournament in Darmstadt as a qualifier, with wins over the top three seeds en route to the title.

ITF Circuit finals

Singles (4–3)

Doubles (6–1)

References

External links
 
 

1969 births
Living people
German female tennis players
West German female tennis players